Kamber Ali Khan

Qamber Ali Khan is a city in the north-west of the Sindh province of Pakistan. It is the 96th largest city of Pakistan, according to 2017 census.

Geography 
Qamber Ali Khan is situated in North-western Sindh and it owns talukas. It is also included in upper Sindh.

Climate 
Qamber Ali Khan is a monsoon climatic region. On May 26, 2010, the mercury recorded  becoming the hottest city in the country's history. On May 31, 1998 the mercury hit . This hot weather sometimes cost human lives. Hot days continue from May till September, followed by Monsoon Rains, sometime bringing floods in the nearby areas.
Monsoon season starts from July and continues till September and brings Torrential Rains. Pre-Monsoon also occurs occasionally in the month of June while post-monsoon occurs rarely.

Thunderstorms are very common, they often develop in all months. Most dangerous thunderstorm occurred on April 21, 2012, it was a supercell thunderstorm which came from west side with heavy downpour due to strong Western Disturbance which was developed in Gulf of Oman.

Duststorms are also very common in summer and monsoon especially from March to September. On March 27, 2013 a duststorm came with the damaging winds of  due to a severe thunderstorm and it brought some rainfall also.
Hailstorms are unusual and occur mainly from February to April. Qamber Ali Khan experienced a powerful hailstorm in April 2006 and again on 14 March 2015 followed by heavy downpour.

Same as in August 2011 also, the city received intermittent heavy Rains from 25 to 31 August and again in September 2011 with time to time. In Monsoon of 1994 the city received  of rainfall as most powerful low pressures hit Sindh which is the highest rainfall recorded in past 25 years.

Demographics 

The majority of the population in district Qamber Ali Khan speak the native Sindhi language. Saraiki language, are also spoken and understood in various areas of the city.

Education 
Several old and new schools, colleges are functioning in the city for both boys and girls. Many are private and public institutions.

Schools and Colleges 
Some schools such as Government Higher Secondary School, Girls High School, and Government Degree College.

References

Cities in Pakistan